D-Date (stylized as D☆DATE) is a Japanese pop unit of D-Boys, first managed by Watanabe Entertainment, transferred to Avex Entertainment in 2012.

Information

D-Date was formed in 2010, initially as a 10th anniversary commemoration of Watanabe Entertainment, with the first four most popular and excellent members of D-BOYS, including Kōji Seto, Hirofumi Araki, Yuichi Nakamura, and Shunji Igarashi. Arata Horii was chosen from among 30,000 applicants as the fifth member of the group. In November 2011, Yuichi Nakamura left D-Date and the entertainment business due to a back injury and to concentrate on medical recovery. During D-Date's last performance of their 1st live tour in Tokyo Dome City Hall on June 29, 2012, it was announced that Tomo Yanagishita had joined the group as their newest member. In November 2013, in the last performance of GLORY FIVE 2013 tour at Tokyo Dome City Hall, Shunji Igarashi officially announced his retirement in entertainment business because of new interest in other work. In 2020, Tomo Yanagishita announced he will get married and retire from the entertainment business.

Discography

Singles
  (1 December 2010)
 "Change My Life" (6 April 2011)
 "Day By Day" (27 July 2011)
 "Love Heaven" (11 January 2012)
 "Joker" (22 February 2012)
 "Glory Days" (12 June 2013)

Albums
 1st Date (25 April 2012)

Concert DVDs
 1st Tour 2011 Summer Date Live 手をつないで (Te o Tsunaide)
 D-Date Tour 2012: Date A Live
 D-Date Live Tour 2013: GLORY FIVE

External links
  

Japanese pop music groups
Musical groups from Tokyo
Japanese boy bands